The Staniard Creek is a tidal creek in North Andros, the Bahamas.

See also
List of rivers of the Bahamas

References

Rivers of the Bahamas